Vinicia may refer to:
 Vinicia (moth), a genus of moths in the family Pyralidae
 Vinicia (plant), a genus of plants in the family Asteraceae